Oliver Spencer Halstead (September 22, 1792 – August 29, 1877) was an American politician who served as the Mayor of Newark from 1840 to 1841.

References

1792 births
1877 deaths
Mayors of Newark, New Jersey
New Jersey Whigs
19th-century American politicians
Politicians from Elizabeth, New Jersey